1444 Pannonia is a carbonaceous background asteroid from the outer region of the asteroid belt, approximately  in diameter. It was discovered on 6 January 1938, by Hungarian astronomer György Kulin at Konkoly Observatory in Budapest, Hungary. It was named after the ancient province of the Roman Empire, Pannonia.

Orbit and classification 

Pannonia is a non-family asteroid of the main belt's background population when applying the hierarchical clustering method to its proper orbital elements. It orbits the Sun at a distance of 2.7–3.6 AU once every 5 years and 7 months (2,044 days). Its orbit has an eccentricity of 0.14 and an inclination of 18° with respect to the ecliptic. Pannonias observation arc begins 3 weeks after its official discovery at Konkoly, as no precoveries were taken, and no prior identifications were made.

Naming 

This minor planet was named for Pannonia, an ancient province of the Roman Empire, which was partially located over the territory of the present-day western Hungary. The official  was published by the Minor Planet Center on 1 February 1980.

Physical characteristics

Rotation period 

In April 2001, astronomer Colin Bembrick obtained the first rotational lightcurve of Pannonia at Tarana Observatory  in Australia. Lightcurve analysis gave a well-defined rotation period of 10.756 hours with a brightness amplitude of 0.16 magnitude. In 2002 and 2004, photometric observations by French astronomers Laurent Bernasconi and Bernard Christophe Additional periods of 6.2 and 6.205 hours with an amplitude of 0.57 and 0.37, respectively.

Diameter and albedo 

According to the surveys carried out by the Infrared Astronomical Satellite IRAS, the Japanese Akari satellite, and NASA's Wide-field Infrared Survey Explorer with its subsequent NEOWISE mission, Pannonia measures between 26.36 and 31.49 kilometers in diameter, and its surface has an albedo between 0.04 and 0.47. The Collaborative Asteroid Lightcurve Link derives an albedo of 0.0501 and a diameter of 27.14 kilometers with an absolute magnitude of 11.7.

References

External links 
 Lightcurve Database Query (LCDB), at www.minorplanet.info
 Dictionary of Minor Planet Names, Google books
 Asteroids and comets rotation curves, CdR – Geneva Observatory, Raoul Behrend
 Discovery Circumstances: Numbered Minor Planets (1)-(5000)  – Minor Planet Center
 
 

001444
Discoveries by György Kulin
Named minor planets
19380106